Jógvan Poulsen was the Lawman of the Faroe Islands twice, from 1654 to 1655, and from 1662 to 1677.

Jógvan Poulsen was Faroese. He married the daughter of previous Lawman Jógvan Justinusson. Jógvan Poulsen was raised on a farm in Oyri, before he became elected leader of the Lagting. King Frederik III of Denmark did not like Jógvan Poulsen as Lawman, and replaced him with the Dane Balzer Jacobsen, one of Christoffer Gabel's supporters. Gabel at this time had a monopoly on trade to and from the Faroe Islands, so this was much better for him. Jacobsen was Lawman until 1661, when Jógvan Poulsen again took over. 

His son, Jákup Jógvansson, later also became Lawman of the Faroe Islands.

References

Løgtingið 150 - Hátíðarrit. Tórshavn 2002, Bind 2, S. 366. (Avsnitt Føroya løgmenn fram til 1816) (PDF-Download)

17th-century heads of government
Lawmen of the Faroe Islands
Year of birth unknown
Year of death unknown